Ilídio Silva (23 January 1932 – before 2018) was a Portuguese rower. He competed in the men's coxed four event at the 1960 Summer Olympics.

References

External links
 

1932 births
Year of death missing
Portuguese male rowers
Olympic rowers of Portugal
Rowers at the 1960 Summer Olympics
People from Caminha
Sportspeople from Viana do Castelo District